Simav is a town and a district of Kütahya Province in the Aegean region of Turkey. The town is located on the Simav River.

History
From 1867 until 1922, Simav was part of Hüdavendigâr vilayet.

References

External links
 District municipality's official website 
 District municipality's official website 
 Some Pictures of Simav 
 Ercüment ÇALI 

	 

Populated places in Kütahya Province
Districts of Kütahya Province